Roll, Thunder, Roll! is a 1949 American Western film directed by Lewis D. Collins and starring Jim Bannon, Don Reynolds and Emmett Lynn. It was shot in Cinecolor. It is based on the Red Ryder series by Fred Harman, one of four films made by Eagle-Lion Films featuring the character.

Cast
Jim Bannon as Red Ryder 
Don Reynolds as Little Beaver 
Emmett Lynn as Buckskin 
Marin Sais as Duchess 
I. Stanford Jolley as El Conejo 
Nancy Gates as Carol Loomis 
Glenn Strange as Ace Hanlon 
Lee Morgan as Happy Loomis 
Lane Bradford as henchman Wolf 
Steve Pendleton as Marshal Bill Faugh 
Charles Stevens as Felipe, El Conejo rider 
William Fawcett as Josh Culvert 
Dorothy Latta as Dorothy Culvert 
Joseph J. Greene as townsman Pat
Rocky Shahan as henchman 
Carol Henry as henchman 
George Chesebro as Ben Garson

References

External links

American Western (genre) films
American black-and-white films
1949 Western (genre) films
Films directed by Lewis D. Collins
Eagle-Lion Films films
Films scored by Raoul Kraushaar
Cinecolor films
1940s American films
Red Ryder films